George Ouzounian (born March 27, 1978), known as Maddox, is an American blogger, podcaster, and author. He gained fame on the Internet in the early 2000s for his opinion-oriented website, The Best Page in the Universe, which he still maintains. His first book, The Alphabet of Manliness (2006), became a New York Times bestseller. He is a graduate of Woods Cross High School in Woods Cross, Utah; he also attended the University of Utah, but does not hold a degree.

Writing career
Maddox started The Best Page in the Universe in 1997. He took his pen name from the 1987 original video animation Metal Skin Panic MADOX-01. The majority of the content is satirical. Maddox reported in 2006 that the site's online store earned enough for him to "stay above water." Maddox is reported to have worked as a programmer for a telemarketing company until 2004.

On June 6, 2006, Maddox appeared at the San Diego Comic Con with his comic book, The Best Comic in the Universe. He was also working on a reality television show for Spike TV titled Manformation with Thom Beers and Dick Masterson until the project was shelved in 2011. In 2010, he appeared on Penn & Teller: Bullshit!'''s eighth season episode "Old People" and started his own web series, The Best Show in the Universe, on YouTube. In 2012, Maddox appeared in the web series Tournament of Nerds as the character Kool-Aid Man. Maddox has also performed in the Upright Citizens Brigade Theatre and in the horror film Ooga Booga as the character Skeez.

Maddox has written three books, starting with The Alphabet of Manliness published in 2006. It reached number one on the Amazon.com sales chart. The book is illustrated and has a chapter-length entry for each letter in the English alphabet regarding a "manly" topic (for example, N is for Norris, Chuck).  In 2011, his second book, I Am Better Than Your Kids, was published. Maddox announced his intention to write a third book in May 2015 and he updated fans about the first draft being written in September 2016. The book, titled F*ck Whales: Petty Essays from a Brilliant Mind was released in October 2017.

In 2018, Maddox continued to produce episodes of his YouTube web series The Best Show in the Universe of which his channel has about 250,000 subscribers. In the past, episodes were accompanied by an article on a related topic posted to The Best Page in the Universe. Additionally, Maddox sells shirts, hoodies, hats, mugs, and other merchandise through his store. As of 2020, Maddox regularly streams on Twitch, playing as characters "Bananadox," a talking banana, and  "Cowboy Ox-Mad", an exaggerated cowboy figure.

Podcast and lawsuit
In 2014, Maddox co-created a weekly podcast titled The Biggest Problem in the Universe with Dax Herrera, (better known as "Dick Masterson"). The format of the show rotated between each co-host discussing a problem and soliciting votes from the audience. The podcast had its final episode on May 31, 2016. This led to Maddox creating a new podcast network called Madcast Media. The pilot program, The Best Debate in the Universe features debates where Maddox argues both sides of an issue.

In November 2017, Maddox filed a $372 million harassment lawsuit with the New York Supreme Court against Masterson, individuals at Patreon, and Weber Shandwick copywriter Asterios Kokkinos who made guest appearances on The Biggest Problem in the Universe and The Dick Show''. Maddox and his girlfriend, not named in the suit, allege that the defendants launched a trolling campaign against them which resulted in death threats, rape threats, racial slurs and the loss of sponsorship. They cited an album by Kokkinos and a billboard contest by Masterson, which both attempted to mock Maddox, along with targeted ads on Facebook and Reddit. A representative for Shandwick stated their plans to contest the lawsuit's claims, and Masterson rejected the allegations. On May 16, 2018, Judge Charles Ramos dismissed the claims against all defendants arguing that those against Masterson should have been filed in the jurisdiction of California. Of the claims against Asterios Kokkinos, Ramos expressed frustration as to the poor drafting of the complaint and its lack of specific evidence, saying, "this complaint is such a mess that I can't address these issues because I can't specifically point to what's being alleged as against your client or your client." Ramos dismissed the claims against Weber Shandwick with prejudice stating that they were named in the suit "just because someone used their equipment".

References

External links 

 

20th-century American non-fiction writers
21st-century American non-fiction writers
1978 births
American Internet celebrities
American people of Armenian descent
American podcasters
American satirists
Living people
Place of birth missing (living people)
University of Utah alumni
Writers from Utah
20th-century pseudonymous writers
21st-century pseudonymous writers